is a Japanese diesel engine, heavy machinery and agricultural machinery manufacturer founded in Osaka, Japan in 1912. Yanmar manufactures and sells engines used in a wide range of applications, including seagoing vessels, pleasure boats, construction equipment, agricultural equipment and generator sets. It also manufactures and sells, climate control systems, and aquafarming systems, in addition to providing a range of remote monitoring services.

Company description
Yanmar was founded in March 1912 in Osaka, Japan by Magokichi Yamaoka.

When the company began in 1912, it manufactured gasoline-powered engines. In 1920 the company began production of a small kerosene engine. In 1933, it launched the world's first practical small diesel engine, the HB model.

In 1961 the agricultural machinery division of the company was started.

Yanmar also started supplying engines to John Deere tractors and for some Thermo King Corporation coolers used in refrigerated trucks and trailers. Within the last 20 years, Yanmar has also established a growing presence in the domestic unmanned aerial vehicle (UAV) market in Japan and elsewhere, with small helicopter UAVs primarily used in agricultural spraying and other forms of aerial application.

As described on the company website, "The name [Yanmar] is a combination of the Yanma Dragonfly (known by names such as Oniyanma and Ginyanma) and the "Yama" from the name of the company founder Magokichi Yamaoka."

Timeline

 1912 - Yamaoka Magokichi sets up business under the name  Yamaoka Hatsudoki Seisakusho (Yamaoka Engine Workshop).
 1933 - Production of world's first practical small diesel.
1961 - The agricultural machinery division of the company was started
 1992 - The company produces its 10 millionth diesel engine.
 2015 - Yanmar acquires 70% of Spanish generator-set manufacturer HIMOINSA 
 2016 - Yanmar increases its stake in the Indian company International Tractors, the maker of Sonalika branded tractors, to 30%. The company also bought German compact equipment maker Schaeff from Terex and forged a partnership with Toyota to develop “next generation hulls” for boats.
2019 - Yanmar expanded overseas training schools in China, the Philippines, and India.

References

External links
 Official site
 Article on compact diesel engines.
 Details about the Yanmar Compact Diesel Engines

Construction equipment manufacturers of Japan
Agricultural machinery manufacturers of Japan
Tractor manufacturers of Japan
Defense companies of Japan
Engine manufacturers of Japan
Diesel engine manufacturers
Gas engine manufacturers
Marine engine manufacturers
Engineering companies of Japan
Unmanned aerial vehicles of Japan
Robotics companies of Japan
Japanese brands
Manufacturing companies based in Osaka
Japanese companies established in 1912
Vehicle manufacturing companies established in 1912
Manufacturing companies established in 1912